The Winston County School System consists of the public schools serving Winston County, Alabama.

Member schools

Addison Elementary
Addison High School
Double Springs Elementary
Double Springs Middle
Lynn Elementary
Lynn High School
Meek Elementary
Meek High School
Winston County High School
Winston County Technical Center

External links
  Winston County School System

School districts in Alabama
Education in Winston County, Alabama